Wheeleria spilodactylus (the horehound plume moth)  is a moth of the family Pterophoridae, first described by John Curtis in 1827. It is found in South-Western and Central Europe and the Mediterranean, Asia Minor and North Africa. It has been introduced to Australia as a biocontrol agent for white horehound (Marrubium vulgare).

Adults are on wing from July to September depending on the location.

The difficult to see larvae feed on black horehound (Ballota nigra) and white horehound.

References

External links
 Species info 

Pterophorini
Moths described in 1827
Moths of Australia
Moths of North America
Plume moths of Asia
Plume moths of Africa
Plume moths of Europe
Moths of Asia
Taxa named by John Curtis